Mazeppa, der Volksheld der Ukraine (Mazeppa, the Folk Hero of Ukraine) is a historical film by German director Martin Berger, that was filmed in 1918 and released in July 1919.

Plot 
An historic drama about the Cossack Mazeppa, who at the end of the seventeenth century was a highly placed soldier under the Polish king Jan II Casimir. After a battle, Mazeppa is honoured by the king because of his great honour. A count who feels deprived, takes revenge.

References 

1919 films
German historical films
1910s historical films
Cossacks
1910s German films